Soldiers of Fortune is a 2012 American action film directed by Maksim Korostyshevsky and starring Christian Slater, Dominic Monaghan, Sean Bean, James Cromwell and Ving Rhames. It was shot in Ukraine.

Plot
As the film opens, Captains Craig McCenzie (Christian Slater) and Mike Reed (Freddy Rodriguez) are United States special forces soldiers on a mission to find Osama Bin Laden in an unspecified location in the Middle East. Their mission quickly goes awry when CIA operative Carter Mason (Colm Meaney) turns up independently, but with Reed already having infiltrated the settlement he is unable to extract himself and his cover is quickly blown. Captured by the locals, he is interrogated briefly by Mason, who threatens to emasculate him if he does not disclose the full details of his operation, but he is swiftly freed by McCenzie, much to the displeasure of the agent.

Four years later, both McCenzie and Reed have been dishonorably discharged from the army due to the influence of Mason and are running a struggling private security firm back in the USA. When McCenzie attends a biker gang-run poker tournament to barter for a loan to keep the pair financially stable, he witnesses several other players draw guns on the dealer, before it is revealed that the entire game was simply set up as a test for him, to see whether he has retained his combat skill. When he is offered a well-paid job aiding freedom fighters on a tiny, dictator-controlled European island he initially turns the offer down, but when it is explained to him that Mason is on the island as head of the dictator's brutal military, he changes his mind and he and Reed leave for Europe.

On arriving at a base camp close to the island, the full extent of his job is finally explained to him. The freedom fighters are poorly funded, and thus are sourcing money via a war tourism adventure called Soldiers of Fortune that invites wealthy foreigners to pay to join their ranks for the thrills and experience of a fully tax deductible adventure. To prevent them from risk of death, however, McCenzie and Reed have been drafted in to act as their tour guides and bodyguards, offering them a realistic experience of army life while ensuring they stay out of harm's way. Their five charges (Roman St John, Sam Haussmann, Grimaud Tourneur, Tommy Sin and Charles Herbert Vanderbeer) are for the most part all self-made millionaires who each believe themselves in one way or another to be up to the task of professional soldiery. As the two Captains give them a whistle-stop training, the recruits - with the notable exception of St John (Sean Bean) - all reveal themselves to be hopeless, though they do all gain a basic understanding of weaponry.

In no time at all the five and their escorts are dispatched to their first mission, but they immediately come under attack, resulting in the death of Reed along with the rest of McCenzie's unit. As the Captain and the five manage to reach relative safety, McCenzie turns on his charges, accusing Tourneur (Ving Rhames) of arranging the ambush. Tourneur, a black market weapons dealer, counters by revealing his reason for taking up the holiday - he sold the dictator his arms but realised too late that his buyer had no intention of paying, leading him to crave revenge. Short of options, the group heads for the rebel base, where the tourists discuss their reasons for coming, Sin (Dominic Monaghan) revealing that his psychiatrist has suggested that his addiction to the violent video games he develops has left him disconnected with real life and in need of understanding the realities of warfare.

Further treachery leads to a morning attack on the encampment, and while the five tourists make it to safety, they are all finally exposed to the horrors of war. While McCenzie returns to the camp to save the life of Cecilia, the woman who originally recruited him, the tourists opt to snipe at the attacking troops, which draws attention to them and results in the apparent death of Vanderbeer (Charlie Bewley). As tourists and tour guide reunite and they flee the ambush, St John directs them to a helipad attached to a mine complex, and his obvious knowledge of the terrain forces him to reveal that he is in fact a mineral trader and a native of the island and has only returned in order to arrange supply of the rare and valuable metal coltan. As McCenzie again separates from the group to converse privately with Cecilia, the remaining four again opt to launch an assault by themselves, this time resulting in their capture. In prison they are reunited with Vanderbeer, and though he initially plays innocent they rapidly realise that he is the traitor who informed Mason of the rebels' location; he reveals that he negotiated a deal with the dictator to sell the rebels out in exchange for money to replace his lost fortune, having lost all of his wealth in a stock market crash.

After McCenzie and Cecilia effect a rescue, the group arm themselves before splitting up. McCenzie engages Mason, Sin and Tourneur ambush Vanderbeer, St John flees the compound while Cecilia herself is cut off from the men and leaves on a jet-ski. Haussmann (James Cromwell) sacrifices his life to hold off the rest of the dictator's private army, thus fulfilling his own reason for coming to the island - to die heroically, thus preventing his wife from gaining half of his assets from a pending divorce settlement.

In a lightning-paced finale, Sin kills Vanderbeer, McCenzie avenges himself on Mason, Cecilia is chased down by the dictator's daughter but succeeds in eliminating her also while St John opts to eschew an escape to turn around and save Cecilia from the floating wreckage. Tourneur wraps up the final loose end by killing the dictator with a well-aimed bazooka shot. As the island's inhabitants party into the night, the five survivors toast Haussmann's sacrifice.

Cast

Box office
The film was given a limited release on just 50 screens with minimal marketing in the United States. After 2 weeks it ended its cinema run with a box office result of $38,898. The film was more successful in the Russia-CIS market, where it was released on 500 screens and earned $1,542,287 at the box office and in the United Arab Emirates where it earned $203,101 at the box office.

Critical reception
The review aggregator website Rotten Tomatoes reported a 14% approval rating with an average rating of 3.29/10, based on an aggregation of seven reviews. On Metacritic, the film achieved an average score of 19 out of 100 based on 5 reviews, signifying "Overwhelming dislike".

References

External links
 
 
 
 
 

2012 action films
American action films
Roadside Attractions films
Films scored by Michael Tavera
Films set in Europe
Fictional mercenaries
Films about mercenaries
Films about the United States Army
2010s English-language films
2010s American films
Films set in Ukraine